The Pedro Sienna Awards are honors granted for Chilean audiovisual production. Named for silent film director Pedro Sienna, they were given for the first time in 2006. Outstanding artists are awarded for the development and strengthening of national audiovisual media and the best works, artists, and technicians of the production of works released in the country between January and December of the previous year.

They came about as a result of Law No. 19.981 of 2005 that created the Council of the Art and Audiovisual Industry (CAIA) and the Audiovisual Promotion Fund, both under the National Council of Culture and the Arts (CNCA).

Pedro Sienna was one of the forerunners of Chilean cinema, directing El Húsar de la Muerte (1925) and winning the National Prize for Art in 1966.

The aim of the awards is to recognize an author, artist, technician, or producer who stands out for their artistic quality or projection of their audiovisual work and the relevant activities of dissemination and preservation of audiovisual production.

Except for the Career award, given by the CAIA, the awards are granted by a jury. Two pre-selection committees choose the nominees in the categories for feature films and short films.

All winners receive the Pedro Sienna sculpture. It is made of stainless steel with a base of black granite.

Ceremony format
Beginning with their first edition, the Pedro Sienna Awards were handed out at the end of each year to reward the best of that year. However, in 2016 it was decided to move the awards ceremony to the middle of the year, modifying the period of the release dates of the films that are eligible. That is, beginning with the 10th edition, the awards celebrate the best of the previous year. So although there is no version called 2015 Pedro Sienna Awards, strictly speaking, the films released that year were awarded in 2016.

Summary of winners

Categories

Discontinued categories
 Best Feature Length Fiction, Animated, or Documentary Film (2006 only)
 Best Costume or Makeup Design (2006 only)
 Best Sound Design (only 2007)
 Best Soundtrack (2008 only)
 Best Supporting Performance (2006, 2007, and 2008)
 Best Short or Medium-length Film (2006 only)
 Best Fiction or Animated Short Film (2007 and 2008)

See also
 Altazor Award
 Pablo Neruda Order of Artistic and Cultural Merit

References

External links
 

2006 establishments in Chile
Awards established in 2006
Chilean film awards